Boniface of Brussels (1183 – 19 February 1260) was a Catholic prelate who served as the Bishop of Lausanne from circa 1231 until 1239 when he resigned after agents of Holy Roman Emperor Frederick II assaulted him. His relics are housed at the Kapellekerk, and at La Cambre where he died.

Biography
Boniface was born in what is today Belgium in 1183. A Cistercian monk of the Abbey of Cambre, near Brussels, he left in 1200 left to study at University of Paris.

Distinguished for his learning, he taught dogma and became a popular lecturer. He was ordained to the priesthood while in France and from 1222 until 1229 taught at the college. But there soon became a bitter dispute between the teachers and students which prompted him to leave and find work elsewhere. He later taught until 1231 in Cologne at the cathedral school.

He became the Bishop of Lausanne in 1231 and was enthroned in his new see in March 1231 after receiving his episcopal consecration. He was enthusiastic about this appointment but was faced with corrupt priests which he condemned in a pulpit address while also singling out King Frederick II. The king sent his agents to attack Boniface who sustained serious injuries but managed to escape. In 1239, he travelled to Rome and secured permission from a reluctant Pope Gregory IX to resign. He later served as an auxiliary bishop in Brabant.

In 1245 he attended the First Council of Lyon which Pope Innocent IV had convoked, and later retired to La Cambre Abbey. Boniface died in 1265.

See also
 List of Catholic saints

References

External links

Santi e Beati
Boniface at Catholic Online

1183 births
1260 deaths
People from Ixelles
13th-century Roman Catholic bishops in the Holy Roman Empire
Prince-bishops in the Holy Roman Empire
University of Paris alumni
Academic staff of the University of Paris
Venerated Catholics
Bishops of Lausanne
Canonizations by Pope Clement XI